Paul Kennerley (born 1948) is an English singer-songwriter, musician, and record producer working in the American contemporary country music industry.

Biography
Paul Kennerley was born in Hoylake, Cheshire (now Merseyside), England in 1948. In 1976, he was living in London and working in advertising when he first heard country music — particularly, the song "Let's All Help the Cowboys Sing the Blues" by Waylon Jennings. "It really excited me," Kennerley recalls in his artist biography for Universal Music Group. "I immediately hunted down every Waylon record I could find."

Paul Kennerley quit his job in advertising and allowed himself three months to develop his talents as a songwriter.

Recordings
In 1972, Paul Kennerley recorded an album with a rock band called 'Holy Roller' at Virgin record's newly opened Manor studio, with Tom Newman (Mike Oldfield, Tubular Bells etc.) and Philip Newell, and Newman subsequently sang all the songs on the demonstration tapes of the White Mansions album.

Paul's first project was White Mansions, a 1978 concept album set in the Confederate States of America during the American Civil War. The project was picked up by A&M Records, with Glyn Johns producing. A number of notable artists recorded the music, including Waylon Jennings, Jessi Colter, Steve Cash of the Ozark Mountain Daredevils and Eric Clapton.

In 1980, a second concept album was released, The Legend of Jesse James, which featured more notable artists, including Johnny Cash, Emmylou Harris, Charlie Daniels, Albert Lee and Levon Helm.

Misery with a Beat, his 1995 EP, featured Richard Bennett and Billy Bremner on guitar, Michael Rhodes on bass, and Chad Cromwell on drums with songs including   "Love Match"; - "Heart Full of Rain"; - "Tryin' to Get Over You" (co-written with J Ford & Bobby Womak); - "She was Mine" - and - "The Heartbreak Kind" (co-written with Marty Stuart)

Songwriting
Neither White Mansions nor Jesse James were commercially successful, but they did establish Kennerley as a serious songwriter. Among his early compositions was "Born to Run", which Emmylou Harris recorded in 1981 for her album, Cimarron, and she continues to frequently perform the song in her concerts.

Kennerly continued to live in London while he wrote songs, but, in 1983, moved to Nashville, Tennessee, where he started working with Harris on her semi-autobiographical concept album, The Ballad of Sally Rose, co-writing and producing the album. Kennerley also collaborated with Harris on her albums Thirteen and Bluebird, and writing the songs "In My Dreams" and "Heartbreak Hill".

Kennerley also wrote songs for The Judds ("Young Love", "One Man Woman", "Let Me Tell You About Love", "Cry Myself to Sleep", "Have Mercy" and "Give a Little Love"), Marty Stuart ("Hillbilly Rock", "Western Girls", "Tempted", "Till I Found You", "Little Things"), Tanya Tucker ("Walking Shoes"), Sweethearts of the Rodeo ("Chains of Gold"), Patty Loveless ("Blue Memories"), Juice Newton ("Tell Me True"), The Everly Brothers as well as Carla Olson & John York (First In Line).

Personal life
Kennerley was married to Emmylou Harris from 1985 to 1993.

Awards
Paul Kennerley was named Broadcast Music Incorporated Writer of the Year in 1989.

Songs Used in TeleVision Shows

Songs Used in Films

Artists who have recorded Paul Kennerley songs (from the Universal Catalogue)
Bobby Walker - Got Me A Woman

John Anderson ~ Chat Atkins & Mark Knopfler ~ Garth Brooks ~ The Bee Good Tanyas
Dierks Bentley ~ Joe Brown ~ Jessie Buckley ~ Johnny Cash ~ June Carter & Johnny Cash 
Ray Charles & B.J.Thomas ~ Ray Charles & Johnny Cash ~ Glen Campbell 
The Class of '55 (Jerry Lee Lewis; Carl Perkins; Roy Orbison & Johnny Cash)
David Allen Coe ~ Jessie Colter ~ Charlie Daniels ~ Gail Davies ~ Rick Danko 
John Dillon ~ Lonnie Donegan ~ Steve Earle ~ Dave Edmunds 
The Everly Brothers ~ Rosie Flores ~ Nanci Griffith ~ Emmylou Harris ~ Levon Helm
The Highwaymen (Waylon Jennings; Kris Kristofferson; Willie Nelson & Johnny Cash) 
Highway 101 ~ Waylon Jennings ~ Wanda Jackson ~ The Judds ~ Jason and the Scorchers
The Kendalls ~ Brenda Lee ~ Patty Loveless ~ Albert Lee ~ Buddy Miller ~ Martina McBride 
Del McCoury ~ The Nitty Gritty Dirt Band & Emmylou Harris ~ The Nitty Gritty Dirt Band & Levon Helm
Juice Newton ~ The Oak Ridge Boys ~ Marie Osmond ~ Jason Risenberg ~ Bruce Robinson 
Kenny Rogers ~ Linda Ronstadt ~ Linda Ronstadt & Emmylou Harris ~ Harry Dean Stanton 
Marty Stuart ~ The Sweethearts of the Rodeo ~ Barry & Holly Tashian ~ Travis Tritt 
Tanya Tucker ~ Monty Warden ~ Steve Wariner ~ Don Williams ~ Kelly Willis ~ Lee Ann Womak 
Wynonna ~ Trisha Yearwood ~ John Starling & Emmylou Harris ~ Bradley Cooper & Lady Gaga

Top 20 songs on the Billboard Country Charts written by Paul Kennerley

NOTE 
( 18 of the above songs received BMI Awards, 15 of which were 1 million plays, 4 were 2 million plays and 1 was a 3 million play award )

Discography

Recordings
 1978: White Mansions (A&M) all songs written by Kennerly and performed by other artists
 1979: The Legend of Jesse James (A&M) all songs written by Kennerly and performed by other artists
 1998: Misery With A Beat EP (Spinout)

As producer
 1985: Emmylou Harris - The Ballad of Sally Rose (Warner Bros.)
 1986: Emmylou Harris - Thirteen (Warner Bros.)

As composer

* Class of 55 (Carl Perkins; Jerry Lee Lewis; Roy Orbison and Johnny Cash)

References

External links

 

1948 births
Living people
British expatriates in the United States
English country singer-songwriters
English country guitarists
English male guitarists
English record producers
People from Hoylake
People from Nashville, Tennessee
British male singer-songwriters